Below are the rosters for the Arizona Fall League (AFL), an off-season baseball league owned and operated by Major League Baseball. The AFL operates during the autumn in Arizona at six different baseball complexes.

East Division

Mesa Solar Sox

Salt River Rafters

Scottsdale Scorpions

West Division

Glendale Desert Dogs

Peoria Javelinas

Surprise Saguaros

External links
Arizona Fall League website

Rosters
Arizona Fall League